Curug is a district within Tangerang Regency in the province of Banten, Java, Indonesia. It covers an area of 27.41 km2 and had a population of 165,812 at the 2010 Census and 174,867 at the 2020 Census.

References

Tangerang Regency
Districts of Banten
Populated places in Banten